The Valea Rece (meaning Coldness Creek) is a left tributary of the river Trotuș in Romania. It discharges into the Trotuș in Făgetu de Sus.

References

Rivers of Romania
Rivers of Harghita County
Rivers of Bacău County